Hybochelus is a genus of sea snails, marine gastropod mollusks in the family Chilodontaidae (formerly in the family Trochidae, the top snails).

Species
Species within the genus Hybochelus include:
 Hybochelus cancellatus (Krauss, 1848)
Species brought into synonymy
 Hybochelus fossulatus (Souverbie [in Souverbie & Montrouzier], 1875): synonym of Hybochelus cancellatus (Krauss, 1848)
 Hybochelus leucogranulatus Fu & Sun, 2006: synonym of Cataegis leucogranulatus (Fu & Sun, 2006)
 Hybochelus mysticus (Pilsbry, 1889): synonym of Euchelus mysticus Pilsbry, 1889

References

 
Chilodontaidae
Gastropod genera